The North Carolina Science Festival (NCSF) is a month-long, yearly celebration encompassing hundreds of  events throughout the state of North Carolina. The festival is organized by Morehead Planetarium and Science Center on the University of North Carolina at Chapel Hill campus with the goal of highlighting the educational, cultural and economic impact of science in the state. NCSF events include hands-on activities, talks, lab tours, exhibits and performances for all ages.  The event has grown into the largest science festival in the world.

History

2010 
The first North Carolina Science Festival was held Sept. 11-26, 2010, featuring Bugfest at the North Carolina Museum of Natural Sciences as its kick-off event. The festival coordinated with the USA Science and Engineering Festival and Observe the Moon night

The festivals activities were hosted by museums and universities, others were hosted by businesses with science connections. The state's wine industry was showcased in events featuring the science of winemaking.  The University of North Carolina hosted Jamie Hyneman and Adam Savage of Mythbusters for a program at the Smith Center with nearly 5,000 in attendance. East Carolina University and Go-Science hosted more than 2,000 participants for the Eastern Regional Science Expo with exhibitions and demonstrations.  The festival concluded with the UNC Science Expo at the University of North Carolina at Chapel Hill.

The inaugural festival in 2010 included events at 89 participating organizations, with 22 percent of these programs in the mountain region, 63 percent in the piedmont region and 15 percent in the coastal region. As of Oct. 7, 2010, 60 host organizations had already reported attendance for 98 events totalling 89,494 participants.

Sponsors for the 2010 North Carolina Science Festival were Burroughs Wellcome Fund, Time Warner Cable and SAS (platinum level); Biogen Idec, Lenovo, Magellan Science, The News & Observer and UNC Health Care (gold level); Inspire Pharmaceuticals, NC STEM Community Collaborative and UNC School of Education (silver level); BB&T, The Research Triangle Park, Life Technologies Foundation, Dr. Nicholas B. Duck and family and the NC GlaxoSmithKline Foundation.

Present Day 
Following the inaugural North Carolina Science Festival, organizers and board members moved the festival's annual schedule from fall to spring. The second North Carolina Science Festival was held April 13–29, 2012, again offering a series of science expos, guest speakers, tours, activities and other events across the state.

Signature events included presentations by Neil deGrasse Tyson at UNC-Chapel Hill and by Adam Savage and Jamie Hyneman at UNC-Charlotte   Signature events in 2013 included presentations by Alton Brown in Durham and Charlotte as well as a State Wide Star Party at 45 sites across the state.

The 2017 festival was kicked off by Apollo 13 astronaut Jim Lovell and a proclamation by Roy Cooper naming April STEM Education Month in the state.  The 2017 festival also marked the first year with events in each of North Carolina's 100 counties.

References

External links
 
 

Science festivals
Science events in the United States
Science and technology in North Carolina
2010 establishments in North Carolina
Recurring events established in 2010